Henrion is a surname. Notable people with the surname include:

Daphne Hardy Henrion (1917–2003), British sculptor
Denis Henrion, French mathematician born at the end of the 16th century
Georges Henrion (born 1894), Belgian athlete
Henri Kay Henrion (1914–1990), German graphic designer
Jean Henrion, former French figure skater
John Henrion (born 1991), American professional ice hockey center
Ludivine Henrion (born 1984), Belgian road bicycle racer
Mathieu-Richard-Auguste Henrion (1805–1862), Baron, French magistrate, historian, and journalist
Paul Henrion, (1819–1901), French composer
Robert Henrion (1915–1997), Belgian fencer
Pierre Paul Nicolas Henrion de Pansey (1742–1829), French jurist and politician
Michael Robert Henrion Posner (born 1988), American singer-songwriter, poet, and record producer

See also
Henrion, Dassy & Heuschen double-barrel revolvers, type of revolver with two stacked barrels and two concentric sets of chambers, each serving its own barrel
Henri